Gabriel Batistuta is an Argentine former professional footballer who made 78 appearances for Argentina between 1991 and 2002.

He is Argentina's second highest goalscorer, behind only Lionel Messi, with 56 goals in 78 international matches.

International goals 
Scores and results list Argentina's goal tally first, score column indicates score after each Batistuta goal.

Statistics

References

External links 
 Gabriel Omar Batistuta - Goals in International Matches – RSSSF

Batistuta, Gabriel
Argentina national football team records and statistics